= Eric Hechtman =

American tennis coach

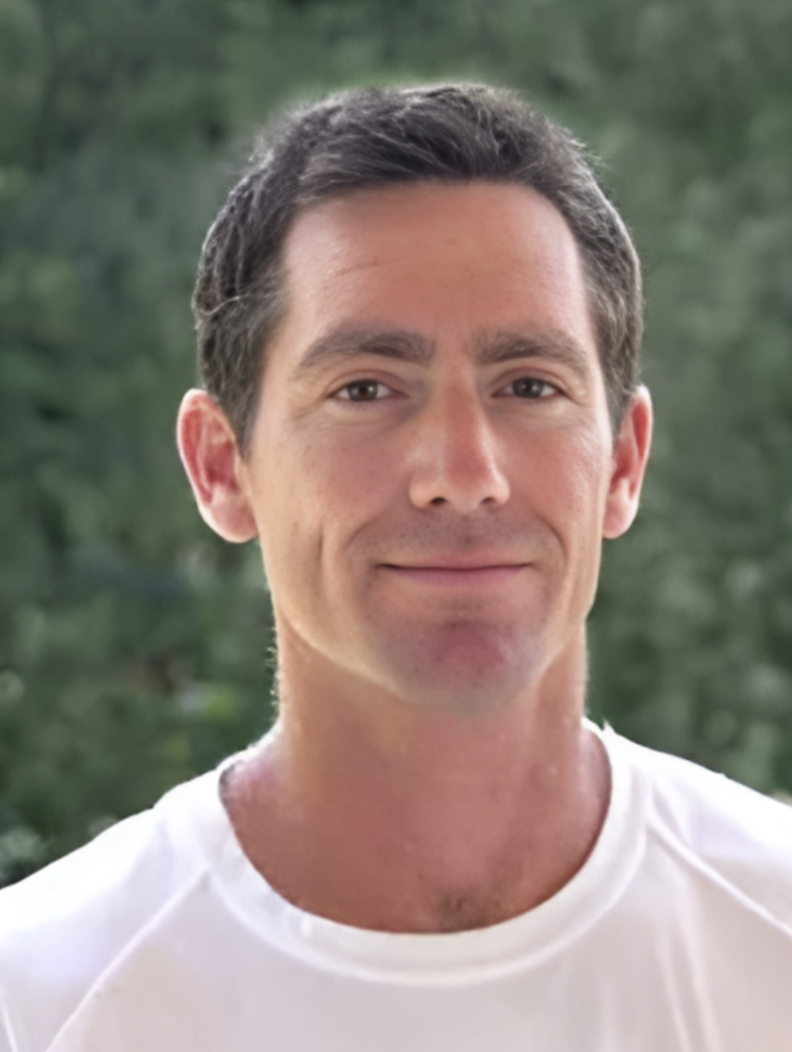
Eric Hechtman coaching in 2022

Eric Hechtman (born October 24, 1983) is an American tennis coach and former collegiate player. He is best known for serving as a coach to Venus Williams beginning in 2019 and joining Serena Williams’ coaching team during her return to competition at Wimbledon in 2022.

== Early life and education ==
Hechtman was born and raised in Miami, Florida. He attended Miami Sunset Senior High School, where he competed in state-level tennis and earned local athletic honors.

He attended the University of Miami from 2002 to 2006, playing for the Miami Hurricanes men's tennis team on an athletic and academic scholarship. He served as team captain, was named team MVP, and accumulated one of the highest combined singles and doubles win totals in program history.

== Professional playing career ==
After graduating in 2006, Hechtman competed on the professional circuit, primarily in ITF Futures events. He reached career-high rankings of No. 1195 in singles and No. 1058 in doubles. He played professionally until 2011.

== Coaching career ==
In March 2019, Hechtman began coaching Venus Williams. During their partnership, she reached several WTA Tour quarterfinals in 2019, including at Indian Wells and Cincinnati.

In June 2022, Hechtman joined Serena Williams’ team as she returned from a year-long break to compete at Wimbledon. He continued coaching her through the 2022 US Open, her final professional tournament.

According to the Women's Tennis Association’s coach directory, Hechtman has worked with various players on the WTA Tour.

== Community involvement ==
Hechtman has participated in youth tennis clinics and community events in Miami, including programs led by local nonprofits in collaboration with professional players.
